Brenda Starink (born July 29, 1974 in Rotterdam) is a former backstroke swimmer from the Netherlands, who competed for her native country in two consecutive Summer Olympics, starting in 1996 in Atlanta, Georgia. She retired from the sport in 2001. Starink won a total number of sixteen Dutch titles on long course (50m) during her career.

See also
Dutch records in swimming

References
  Dutch Olympic Committee
  Profile in Zwemkroniek

1974 births
Living people
Dutch female backstroke swimmers
Olympic swimmers of the Netherlands
Swimmers at the 1996 Summer Olympics
Swimmers at the 2000 Summer Olympics
Swimmers from Rotterdam
20th-century Dutch women